Hon. Tu'i'afitu (21 December 1933 – 4 October 2005), born Samisoni Fonomanu Tu'i'afitu, was a Tongan nobleman, Member of Parliament, and the Governor of Vavaʻu.

Education
Tu'i'afitu was educated at Tonga High School and then in Australia at Newington College (1953–1955). He then attended Seddon Memorial Technical College in Auckland, New Zealand.

Public service career
He joined the Tongan Civil Service as a clerk in 1962 and was promoted to the role of administrative officer at Fua'amotu International Airport in 1968. He became senior administration officer at the airport in 1984 and then senior administration officer of the Lupepau'u Airport in Vavaʻu in 1987.

Parliament
Tu'i'afitu served as Minister of Lands, Survey, and Natural Resources.

Governor
Hon. Tu'i'afitu was appointed to the Noble title of Tu'i'afitu in 1976 and as Acting Governor of Vavaʻu  in 1988 and then Governor of Vavaʻu in 1991.

References
  

1933 births
2005 deaths
Members of the Legislative Assembly of Tonga
People educated at Newington College
Tongan Methodists
Tongan nobles
Government ministers of Tonga
Governors of Vavaʻu